Jerry Barnhart is an American sport shooter and firearms instructor with three individual silver medals from the IPSC Handgun World Shoots (1986, 1990 and 1996), and has been team member of the U.S. gold winning team six times. He is also ten times national champion with 5 US IPSC Championship titles and 5 USPSA Handgun Nationals titles, and three time Steel Challenge World Speed Shooting Champion (1998, 1991 and 1987).

References

Living people
IPSC shooters
Year of birth missing (living people)